The One Hundred Ninth Ohio General Assembly was the legislative body of the state of Ohio in 1971 and 1972. In this General Assembly, both the Ohio Senate and the Ohio House of Representatives were controlled by the Republican Party.  In the Senate, there were 20 Republicans and 13 Democrats. In the House, there were 54 Republicans and 45 Democrats. It was the last General Assembly to use districts drawn after the 1966 apportionment.

Major events

Vacancies
January 5, 1971: Senator Walter E. Powell (R-4th) resigns to take a seat in the United States House of Representatives.
January 11, 1971: Senator William B. Nye (D-28th) resigns to take a seat in the cabinet of Governor John Gilligan.
December 31, 1971: Senator James K. Leedy (R-19th) resigns. 
August 23, 1972: Senator Jerry O'Shaughnessy (D-15th) dies.

Appointments
January 5, 1971: Donald E. “Buz” Lukens is appointed to the 4th Senatorial District.
January 12, 1972: Kenneth F. Berry is appointed to the 19th Senatorial District.
January 13, 1971: John Poda is appointed to the 28th Senatorial District.
October 2, 1972: Robert O'Shaughnessy is appointed to the 15th District.

Senate

Leadership

Majority leadership
 President of the Senate: John W. Brown
 President pro tempore of the Senate: Theodore Gray
 Majority Whip:

Minority leadership
 Leader: Anthony Calabrese
 Assistant Leader: Oliver Ocasek

Members of the 109th Ohio Senate

House of Representatives

Members of the 109th Ohio House of Representatives 

Appt.- Member was appointed to current House Seat

See also
Ohio House of Representatives membership, 126th General Assembly
Ohio House of Representatives membership, 125th General Assembly
 List of Ohio state legislatures

References
Ohio House of Representatives official website
Project Vote Smart – State House of Ohio
Map of Ohio House Districts
Ohio District Maps 2002–2012
2006 election results from Ohio Secretary of State

Ohio legislative sessions
Ohio
Ohio
1971 in Ohio
1972 in Ohio